"In the Summertime" is a song by Australian rock group Thirsty Merc, released on 11 April 2005 as the third single from the band's self-titled debut album (2004). The track is a tribute to the Australian summer and is a reflection of the laidback Aussie lifestyle. The song reached number 43 on the Australian ARIA Singles Chart and is used as the theme song for the Australian television program Bondi Rescue. It was the band's first song to chart in New Zealand, where it peaked at number 12. 

The Adrian Van De Velde–directed music video was nominated for Best Video at the ARIA Music Awards of 2005.

Track listing
Australian CD single
 "In the Summertime"
 "Magic Kinetic"
 "My Completeness" (live)
 "Someday, Someday" (live)

Charts

References

Thirsty Merc songs
2004 songs
2005 singles
Australian rock songs
Songs written by Rai Thistlethwayte
Warner Music Australasia singles